Eaton is a town in Clark County in the U.S. state of Wisconsin. The population was 712 at the 2010 census.

Geography
The Town of Eaton is located in the center of Clark County and is bordered to the north by the city of Greenwood. The Black River flows from north to south through the center of the town.

Demographics
As of the census of 2000, there were 665 people, 201 households, and 163 families residing in the town.  The population density was 19.7 people per square mile (7.6/km2).  There were 221 housing units at an average density of 6.5 per square mile (2.5/km2).  The racial makeup of the town was 98.50% White, 0.45% African American, 0.15% Native American, 0.15% Asian, 0.30% from other races, and 0.45% from two or more races. Hispanic or Latino of any race were 0.30% of the population.

There were 201 households, out of which 45.3% had children under the age of 18 living with them, 74.1% were married couples living together, 4.0% had a female householder with no husband present, and 18.9% were non-families. 17.4% of all households were made up of individuals, and 7.5% had someone living alone who was 65 years of age or older.  The average household size was 3.31 and the average family size was 3.77.

In the town, the population was spread out, with 38.6% under the age of 18, 6.2% from 18 to 24, 25.9% from 25 to 44, 19.2% from 45 to 64, and 10.1% who were 65 years of age or older.  The median age was 32 years. For every 100 females, there were 113.1 males.  For every 100 females age 18 and over, there were 110.3 males.

The median income for a household in the town was $37,000, and the median income for a family was $42,679. Males had a median income of $28,194 versus $19,464 for females. The per capita income for the town was $12,250.  About 15.8% of families and 23.2% of the population were below the poverty line, including 35.0% of those under age 18 and 5.3% of those age 65 or over.

References

Towns in Wisconsin
Towns in Clark County, Wisconsin